Hurricane Alice: A Feminist Review was a feminist journal edited by a volunteer group of academics, graduate students, university staff, and community members from 1983 to 1998. From its first issue in the spring of 1983 through the end of 1995, it was housed in the Department of English at the University of Minnesota, Twin Cities. The journal moved to Rhode Island College in 1996, where it continued publication until 1998. An outgrowth of second-wave feminism, Hurricane Alice sought to address local, regional, and national audiences by publishing a variety of feminist perspectives on matters of social, political, and cultural concern. It included original essays, reviews, interviews, and creative writing by established and emerging writers, such as Jewelle Gomez, Susan Griffin, Alice Walker,and Nellie Wong, as well as original graphics by area artists. The editors were committed to a feminist understanding that all oppressions are connected and that coalitions across divides of race, class, sexuality, and geography are the path to liberation. That commitment led to the journal’s consistent attention to those interconnections, including publishing the work of Black, Indigenous, and other scholars and writers of color as well as that of lesbian and working class women of all races.

Background 
Hurricane Alice grew out of an after-theater discussion among Shirley Garner, Martha Roth, Madelon Sprengnether, and Regina (Jeanne) Strauchon of a play about the life of Willa Cather. This performance, titled Willa, was developed by playwright Marisha Chamberlain in collaboration with members of Illusion Theater, which mounted the stage production.

The four friends, all of whom went on to serve as original editors of the journal, mused about how a conversation such as theirs might find its way into print. They discussed The New York Review of Books and the Women’s Review of Books as models for the kind of venue they imagined, concluding that they wanted to address a wider range of issues, to feature more genres (e.g. fiction and art work), and to utilize a cheaper format than did either model. At the end of the evening, they resolved to create a journal of their own. The Hurricane Alice Foundation was established as a 501c3 on 23 July 1984 and dissolved in 1998, after the journal relocated to Rhode Island. Funding for the journal was provided by a combination of subscriptions, donations, benefit readings, and grants for special issues.

Name 
In the course of their initial conversation, Shirley Garner said she had long dreamed of such a journal and proposed the name Hurricane Alice as an allusion to the National Weather Service’s mid-20th century policy of naming hurricanes after women. In an interview with University of Minnesota History Professor Clarke Chambers, she explained, “I thought of it as turning things upside down, turning a habit of naming bad things after women into something good, and I thought of Alice because Geoffrey Chaucer’s name for the Wife of Bath is Alice.” Madelon added her association to Lewis Carroll’s Alice in Wonderland. Jeanne offered her understanding of hurricanes as starting from a depression or low pressure area. Although hurricanes are destructive, Jeanne explained, they could also be viewed as a creative force as the new replaced what had been destroyed or broken, which was perfectly in line with what the friends hoped to do as they explored women’s issues.

Logo 

Jeanne Strauchon solicited the logo for Hurricane Alice from graphic designer Gail Swanlund. This image appeared on the cover of each issue. Jeanne’s statement describing its origin (paraphrased in "Name," above) was repeated on the masthead page from the journal’s inauguration to its conclusion.

Editorial staff 
From 1983 through 2001, a total of eighty-two women—students, faculty members, and community members from both Minneapolis and Providence—served on the editorial staff of Hurricane Alice. Named here are the founding editors and the first group of Rhode Island editors.

Founding editors 

 Martha Roth, executive editor
Shirley Nelson Garner
 Christine Mack Gordon
 Mollie Hoben
 Toni A. H. McNaron
 Maureen T. Reddy
 Judy Remington
 Madelon Sprengnether
 Regina (Jeanne) Strauchon Sugnet

Rhode Island editors 

 Maureen T. Reddy, executive editor
Meg Carroll
Joan Dagle
Julie Lima
Carol Maloney
Marjorie Roemer
Pauline Santos
Desiree Schuler
Carol Shelton
Cynthia Stanton

Other notable contributors 

 Ellen Bass, American poet 
 Marion Dane Bauer, American children's author  
 Martha Boesing, American theater director, playwright  
 Beth Brant, Mohawk writer, essayist, poet 
 Evalina Chao, American violinist, memoirist and novelist 
 Pearl Cleage, African-American playwright, essayist, novelist, poet, political activist  
 Chitra Divakaruni, Indian-American author, poet and writing professor 
 Heid Erdrich, Ojibwe writer and editor of poetry, short stories, and nonfiction  
 Jane Gallop, American Professor 
 Patricia Hampl, American memoirist, writer, lecturer, and educator 
 Endesha Ida Mae Holland, American scholar, playwright, and civil rights activist
 Marie Myung-Ok Lee, Korean-American author and essayist  
 Meridel Le Seuer, American writer associated with the proletarian literature movement 
 Lyn Lifshin, American poet and teacher   
 Barbara Macdonald, American social worker, lesbian feminist and ageism activist  
 Catharine A. MacKinnon, American radical feminist legal scholar, activist, and author
 Alison McGhee, American author of children's books and adult novels 
 Margaret Randall, American-born writer, photographer, activist and academic 
 Cheri Register, American author and teacher     
 Canyon Sam, author, performance artist, and Tibetan rights activist  
 Dorrit Willumsen, Danish writer

Special issues

Mother Journeys 
Mother Journeys: Feminists Write about Mothering (Minneapolis: Spinsters Ink, 1994) grew out of a special issue of Hurricane Alice titled “Reimagining Gender for Children’s Literature,” vol. 4, no. 3, guest edited by Amy Sheldon. Sheldon’s lead piece, “Bedtime Stories,” prompted her to propose a collection of essays about feminist mothering, a topic largely absent from feminist literature and theory. Maureen Reddy and Martha Roth, both founding editors of Hurricane Alice, joined her as co-editors of this volume.

In addition to essays by Hurricane Alice editors Shirley Nelson Garner, Maureen T. Reddy, Judy Remington, Martha Roth, Amy Sheldon, and Madelon Sprengnether, Mother Journeys includes contributions by Linda P. Aaker, Judith Arcana, Martha Boesing, Sheila Fay Braithwaite, Sarah Bruckner, Judith Lerner Crawley, Rita Dove, Jewelle Gomez, Marilyn Hacker, Kimiko Hahn, Molly Hite, Linda Hogan, Akasha (Gloria T.) Hull, Linnea Johnson, Maxine Kumin, Molly Collins Layton, Jane Lazarre, Sherry Lee, Genny Lim, Kathryn S. March, Lynda Marin, Diane McPherson, Greta Hofmann Nemiroff, Sharon Olds, Alicia Ostriker, Minnie Bruce Pratt, Barbara Schapiro, Carolee Schneemann, and Rose Stone. Nicole Hollander, Nancy Spero, and Vera B. Williams contributed cartoons and drawings.

Mother Journeys received the 1995 Minnesota Book Award in nonfiction. It also won the Susan B. Koppelman Award, from the Popular Culture Association/American Culture Association (PCA/ACA) in 1995.

Publication ceases 
Hurricane Alice ceased publication after Volume 14 (1998) due to financial difficulties, as the costs of publishing rose and outpaced the editors’ ability to raise funds. The Council of Literary Magazines and Presses (CLMP) offered free consulting; the CLMP consultant helped the Rhode Island editors recognize the intractability of the economic bind and to decide to close the journal.

Archives 
All fourteen volumes of Hurricane Alice, including links to individual articles, may be accessed at the University of Minnesota Libraries. Hurricane Alice is also available on microfilm in the Gale Family Library at the Minnesota Historical Society.

References

External links 
 Library Finding Guide for Hurricane Alice at the University of Minnesota Libraries
 Catalog entry for Hurricane Alice (on microfilm) in the Gale Family Library at the Minnesota Historical Society
 A partial set of full-text issues of Hurricane Alice is available through the GenderWatch database (Proquest), available at many university and public libraries
 Mother Journeys: Feminists Write About Mothering. Maureen T. Reddy; Martha Roth; Amy Sheldon, eds. (1994). Spinsters Ink.  at The Internet Archive (table of contents and front/back matter only)

Feminism and society
Feminism in the United States
English-language journals
Newspapers published in Minnesota
Women in Minnesota
Women's studies journals
Feminist magazines
Lesbian feminist literature
Publications established in 1983
Visual arts magazines published in the United States
Literary magazines published in the United States
Women's magazines published in the United States
Defunct women's magazines published in the United States
Triannual magazines published in the United States